Munde Patiale De is a 2012 comedy Punjabi film. The film is directed by Mohan Sharma and produced by Rajesh Lahr under the banner of Tarajee Entertainment.

Plot
It is a story of three college friends Samar, Gill and Lucky, who meet up after a long time at Samar's wedding, and the funny situations that they land up in, makes for the plot. An out-and-out comedy, this movie has a rather young cast.

Cast
Gaurav Kakkar
Aman Jot
Surbhi Jyoti as Priyanka
Rahul Kalra 
Binnu Dhillon
Satwant Kau
Sanyam Nikhanj

References

External links

Punjabi-language Indian films
2010s Punjabi-language films